Niquiá Ecological Station is an ecological station in the Caracaraí municipality of Roraima state, Brazil.

History

It is administered by the Chico Mendes Institute for Biodiversity Conservation.
The conservation unit is supported by the Amazon Region Protected Areas Program.
The unit was created to preserve the genetic banks of the flora. It is named after the stream from which Aniquiá takes its name.
It lies in the Caracaraí municipality of Roraima state.

Status

The station is a region of transition forest, with tall trees with thin trunks.
Fauna are representative of both the Amazon and the cerrado.
The white-bellied spider monkey (ateles belzebuth) is protected in the station.

References

Sources

1985 establishments in Brazil
Ecological stations of Brazil
Protected areas of Roraima
Protected areas established in 1985